Roger Jones (born 8 November 1946) is an English former footballer, who played as a goalkeeper who played for Bournemouth & Boscombe Athletic, Blackburn Rovers, Newcastle United, Stoke City, Derby County, Birmingham City and York City.

Career
Jones was born in Upton-upon-Severn and was released by his first club, Portsmouth, when they disbanded their reserve team, Jones joined Bournemouth & Boscombe Athletic in August 1965 and after a season in the reserves he established himself as first choice under manager Freddie Cox and after making 177 appearances for the Cherries he earned a move north to Second Division Blackburn Rovers. Rovers were relegated in 1970–71 in 21st position and after three failed attempts to gain a return they won the Third Division title in 1974–75. He moved on to Newcastle United but failed to establish himself on Tyneside and left for Stoke City in February 1977.

He played 41 games in 1977–78 as Stoke failed to gain promotion but a dramatic final day victory over Notts County saw Stoke finish in third place in 1978–79 securing a return to the top flight. He began the 1979–80 season as first choice under Alan Durban but lost his place to Peter Fox and at the end of the campaign was sold to Derby County. He played 46 times for the Rams in 1980–81 winning the club's player of the year award in the process. Whilst at Derby he played four matches on loan at Birmingham City and ended his career with York City. With the Minstermen he helped them to win the Fourth Division title in 1983–84.

International career
He won one cap for England at under-23 level, in a 1–0 defeat away to Hungary under-23 on 30 May 1968.

Post-retirement
After his playing career finished he coached at York City and Sunderland, and later became kit manager for Swindon Town.

Career statistics
Source:

A.  The "Other" column constitutes appearances and goals in the Anglo-Scottish Cup, Football League Trophy.

Honours
 Blackburn Rovers
 Football League Third Division champions: 1974–75

 Stoke City
 Football League Second Division third-place promotion: 1978–79

 York City
 Football League Fourth Division champions: 1983–84

 Individual
 Derby County Player of the Year: 1981
 PFA Team of the Year: 1973–74, 1974–75, 1983–84

References

External links
 

1946 births
Living people
People from Upton-upon-Severn
English footballers
England under-23 international footballers
Association football goalkeepers
Portsmouth F.C. players
AFC Bournemouth players
Blackburn Rovers F.C. players
Newcastle United F.C. players
Stoke City F.C. players
Derby County F.C. players
Birmingham City F.C. players
York City F.C. players
English Football League players
York City F.C. non-playing staff
Sunderland A.F.C. non-playing staff
Swindon Town F.C. non-playing staff
Sportspeople from Worcestershire